Sano vaan Tuomas is the first studio album by Finnish rapper Tuomas Kauhanen.

Track listing

Charts

Release history

References

2013 debut albums
Finnish-language albums